Velika Moštanica is a suburban settlement of Belgrade, Serbia. It is located in the municipality of Čukarica.

Location
Velika Moštanica is located 22 km south-west of Belgrade, between the Belgrade-Obrenovac (5 km away) and Ibarska magistrala (4 km away) freeways. It is statistically classified as a rural settlement (village), and experiences a steady, constant growth of population:

 1921 - 1,923
 1971 - 2,413
 1981 - 2,751
 1991 - 3,084
 2002 - 3,210

References 

 Jovan Đ. Marković (1990): Enciklopedijski geografski leksikon Jugoslavije; Svjetlost-Sarajevo;

External links

Suburbs of Belgrade
Šumadija
Čukarica